The Marajó short-tailed opossum (Monodelphis maraxina) is an opossum species from South America.

It is endemic to Brazil, in the Amazon River delta region within Maranhão state.

References

Opossums
Endemic fauna of Brazil
Fauna of the Amazon
Environment of Maranhão
Mammals of Brazil
Marsupials of South America
Mammals described in 1923
Taxa named by Oldfield Thomas
Taxobox binomials not recognized by IUCN